Solza is a municipality in Italy.

Solza may also refer to:
Solza (animal) (Solza margarita), a species of Ediacaran animal
Solza River, a river in Arkhangelsk region, Russia